Sir Gerard Noel Noel, 2nd Baronet (17 July 1759 – 25 February 1838), of Welham Grove in Leicestershire and Exton Park in Rutland, known as Gerard Edwardes until 1798, was an English Member of Parliament.

Background
Gerard Noel was born Gerard Edwardes at Tickencote, Rutland, on 17 July 1759. He was the son of Gerard Edwardes of Welham Grove and Lady Jane Noel, daughter of Baptist Noel, 4th Earl of Gainsborough. His father was the illegitimate son of the tycoon Mary Edwardes and Lord Anne Hamilton, younger son of James Hamilton, 4th Duke of Hamilton. He was educated at Eton and St John's College, Cambridge.

Career
Noel became partner in a Westminster banking house. He entered Parliament in 1784 as member for Maidstone. However, on the death of his cousin, Thomas Noel, MP for Rutland, he resigned so as to be elected for that county (where the Noels had regularly held one of the seats for centuries). He represented Rutland (in two spells) for well over forty years. Initially a supporter of Pitt the Younger, he was one of a group of MPs who in 1788 tried to form a third party independent of both Pitt and Charles James Fox; in later years, however, he was a consistent Tory.

In 1798 he inherited the estates of his uncle, Henry Noel, 6th Earl of Gainsborough (though not the peerage, which could not pass through the female line), and changed his surname to Noel by royal licence. He served as High Sheriff of Rutland for 1812.

Personal life and death
Noel married three times. His first marriage, in 1780, was to Diana Middleton (d. 1823), daughter of Captain Charles Middleton, the Comptroller of the Navy. The following year Middleton was created a baronet, with a special remainder to his new son-in-law should he have no sons of his own. Middleton later became First Lord of the Admiralty and was raised to a peerage as Lord Barham with a special remainder for the barony to his daughter. Lord Barham died on 17 June 1813 without male issue, and Noel consequently inherited his baronetcy, while Noel's wife inherited the peerage. They had eighteen children:

 Charles Noel Noel (1781–1866), MP, who succeeded to his mother's barony and his father's baronetcy, later created Earl of Gainsborough
 Rev. Gerard Thomas Noel (1782–1851), a canon of Winchester, and father of Caroline Maria Noel (1817–77), author of the hymn "At the Name of Jesus".
 Major Horace Noel (1783–1807)
 Henry Robert Noel (1784–1800)
 William Middleton Noel (1789–1859), MP for Rutland 1838-1840
 Captain Frederic Noel (1790–1833), a naval officer
 Rev. Francis James Noel (1793–1854), Rector of Teston and Nettlestead in Kent
 Berkeley Octavius Noel (1794–1841)
 Rev. Leland Noel (1797–1870), Vicar of Exton and Rector of Horn
 Baptist Wriothesley Noel (1799–1873)
 Louisa Elizabeth Noel (d. 1816), who married the banker William Henry Hoare (d. 1819)
 Emma Noel (d. 1873), who married Stafford O'Brien (d. 1864)
 Charlotte Margaret Noel (d. 1869), who married (first, in 1813) Thomas Welman and (second, in 1839) Thomas Thompson
 Augusta Julia Noel (d. 1833), who married Thomas Babington (d. 1871)
 Juliana Hicks Noel (d. 1855), who married Rev. Samuel Phillips

His second marriage, in 1823, was to Harriet Gill (d. 1826), his mistress of many years, by whom he had a daughter, Harriet Jane (m. Don Ysidro Lopez d'Arze).

After Harriet's death he married a third time, in 1831, to Isabella Evans.

Noel died on 25 February 1838.

References

 Lewis Namier & John Brooke, The History of Parliament: The House of Commons 1754-1790 (London: HMSO, 1964)

External links 
 

|-

1759 births
1838 deaths
Alumni of St John's College, Cambridge
Noel, Gerard, 2nd Baronet
Members of the Parliament of the United Kingdom for English constituencies
Members of the Parliament of Great Britain for English constituencies
People educated at Eton College
Tory MPs (pre-1834)
British MPs 1784–1790
British MPs 1790–1796
British MPs 1796–1800
UK MPs 1801–1802
UK MPs 1802–1806
UK MPs 1806–1807
UK MPs 1807–1812
UK MPs 1812–1818
UK MPs 1818–1820
UK MPs 1820–1826
UK MPs 1826–1830
UK MPs 1830–1831
UK MPs 1831–1832
UK MPs 1832–1835
UK MPs 1835–1837
UK MPs 1837–1841
High Sheriffs of Rutland
Gerard